John Dungan Rigney (October 28, 1914 – October 21, 1984) was a starting pitcher in Major League Baseball who played his entire career for the Chicago White Sox (– and –). A native of River Forest, Illinois, he was signed out of the University of St. Thomas.

Rigney was one of the Chicago White Sox top pitchers in the years prior to World War II. In , he recorded 14 wins with a career-high 3.11 ERA, pitching an 11-inning, 1–0 shutout against the visitors New York Yankees (June 20). It was the first time since 1919 that the Yankees had been shut out in extra innings by one pitcher. After being discharged in 1945, he returned to Chicago, but his playing time was limited by arm injuries. He retired after the  season.

In an eight-season career, Rigney posted a 63–64 record with 605 strikeouts and a 3.59 ERA in 197 appearances, including 132 starts, 66 complete games, 10 shutouts, five saves, and  innings of work.

Rigney married Dorothy Comiskey, granddaughter of Charles Comiskey, founding owner of the White Sox, and daughter of J. Louis Comiskey, another former club president. Following his playing retirement, Rigney took a position in the White Sox front office. In 1956, he became the club's co-general manager along with Chuck Comiskey in replacement of Frank Lane.

Rigney died in Wheaton, Illinois, seven days shy of his 70th birthday.

See also

Chicago White Sox managers and ownership

External links

1940 MLB chronology
Johnny Rigney - Baseballbiography.com
Baseball in Wartime
Retrosheet

1914 births
1984 deaths
United States Navy personnel of World War II
Baseball players from Illinois
Chicago White Sox players
Chicago White Sox executives
Major League Baseball executives
Major League Baseball general managers
Major League Baseball pitchers
St. Thomas (Minnesota) Tommies baseball players
People from River Forest, Illinois